Oguchi Uche (born 10 May 1987) is a Nigerian football player.

Career
Uche started his professional football career with Lobi Stars F.C. Because of his brilliance and commitment in November 2007, he was spotted by an agent for a trial with 1. FC Köln which did not click due to some financial disagreement between the German club and Lobi Stars. He moved in January 2008, from his club Lobi Stars to league rival Enyimba International F.C., on a huge transfer. Oguchi Uche also played for some other Nigerian big professional club sides. After completing his last contract, Uche moved on to secure a contract outside the shores of African by joining Sitra Club Bahrain.

TRAU FC
For the 2019–20 I-League season, Uche joined for TRAU FC, an Imphal based side.

International career
He played for his homeland on youth side and holds currently one A-National game.

References

External links

1986 births
Living people
Nigerian footballers
Igbo sportspeople
Lobi Stars F.C. players
Association football midfielders
Enyimba F.C. players
Dolphin F.C. (Nigeria) players
Abia Warriors F.C. players
I-League players
Bahraini Premier League players
TRAU FC players
Sitra Club players
Al-Ahli Club (Manama) players
Nigerian expatriate footballers
Expatriate footballers in India
Expatriate footballers in Bahrain
Nigerian expatriate sportspeople in India
Nigerian expatriate sportspeople in Bahrain